Halfmoon is a town in Saratoga County, New York, United States.  The population was 25,662 at the 2020 census. The town is apparently named for the shape of the lower elevation land north of the junction of the Hudson and Mohawk Rivers. It is also said to be named for Henry Hudson's ship, the Halve Maen.

Halfmoon is in the southeastern part of the county and is north of Albany.

History

The earliest settlements took place circa  1680 by the Mohawk River.

The town was formed while still part of Albany County in 1788. The name was briefly changed to Orange when the town of Waterford was created in 1816 from part of Halfmoon; however, the current name was restored in 1820. In 1828, the western portion of the town was used to create the town of Clifton Park.

The Erie Canal was built along the southern part of Halfmoon, part of the Mohawk River.

Geography

The southern town line, delineated by the Mohawk River, is the border of Albany County. The eastern town line, at the Hudson River, is the border of Rensselaer County. The northern town line is marked by the Anthony Kill, a tributary of the Hudson River.

Interstate 87, the Adirondack Northway, is a six-lane north–south freeway along the western edge of Halfmoon. U.S. Route 9 parallels the interstate farther to the east and crosses into the town from Albany County on the Crescent Bridge.  New York State Route 146, an east–west highway, intersects US-9 at the hamlet of Clifton Park.  U.S. Route 4 is a north–south highway in the eastern part of the town. New York State Route 236 is a short state highway linking NY-146 to US-9.

Demographics

As of the census of 2000, there were 18,474 people, 7,778 households, and 4,861 families residing in the town.  The population density was 565.9 people per square mile (218.5/km2).  There were 8,172 housing units at an average density of 250.3 per square mile (96.7/km2).  The racial makeup of the town was 94.94% White, 1.27% African American, 0.17% Native American, 1.89% Asian, 0.02% Pacific Islander, 0.41% from other races, and 1.30% from two or more races. Hispanic or Latino of any race were 1.65% of the population.

There were 7,778 households, out of which 30.3% had children under the age of 18 living with them, 49.9% were married couples living together, 9.0% had a female householder with no husband present, and 37.5% were non-families. 29.1% of all households were made up of individuals, and 7.1% had someone living alone who was 65 years of age or older.  The average household size was 2.35 and the average family size was 2.93.

In the town, the population was spread out, with 23.7% under the age of 18, 6.9% from 18 to 24, 36.3% from 25 to 44, 22.5% from 45 to 64, and 10.6% who were 65 years of age or older.  The median age was 36 years. For every 100 females, there were 94.7 males.  For every 100 females age 18 and over, there were 91.4 males.

The median income for a household in the town was $46,234, and the median income for a family was $53,515. Males had a median income of $40,076 versus $30,512 for females. The per capita income for the town was $23,714.  About 3.7% of families and 4.5% of the population were below the poverty line, including 5.6% of those under age 18 and 6.4% of those age 65 or over.

Notable people
Chauncey Boughton, physician and New York State Assembly member
Daniel G. Garnsey, former US Congressman

Education
The Town of Halfmoon falls within three school districts:
 Mechanicville City School District
 Shenendehowa Central School District
 Waterford-Halfmoon Union Free School District

Communities and locations in Halfmoon
 Coons – A hamlet near the northern town line, west of Mechanicville.
 Crescent – A hamlet in the southern part of the town.
 Halfmoon (formerly “Middletown”) – The hamlet of Halfmoon is in the southern part of the town at the junction of County Roads 94, 95, 96, and 99.
 Halfmoon Beach – A riverbank hamlet in the southwestern corner of the town.
 Grays Corners – A location in the southwestern part of the town.
 Newtown – A hamlet in the northeastern part of the town on NY-146.
 Smithtown – A former community south of Newtown.

References

External links

 Early history of Half Moon

Towns in Saratoga County, New York
Populated places established in 1788
Populated places on the Mohawk River